Parham Park SSSI is a  biological Site of Special Scientific Interest in the grounds of Parham Park, west of Storrington in West Sussex. It is a Nature Conservation Review site, Grade 2. 

This medieval deer park has a very rich epiphytic lichen flora, with 165 recorded species. Habitats include woods, parkland, bogs and artificial ponds. The site also has a large heronry and two rare beetles, Ampedus cardinalis and Procraerus tibialis.

The house and grounds are open to the public for a fee.

References

Sites of Special Scientific Interest in West Sussex
Nature Conservation Review sites